Pravda  (means "truth" in Russian) was a monthly Lithuanian youth magazine about urban lifestyle, culture, music, art, fashion and other significant topics. Pravda was founded by former editors of K magazine in 2004. The first issue was published in November 2004. Since the first one, every issue has had a specific topic that is revealed and/or discussed in the magazine's articles. The magazine was discontinued in 2010 after an attempt to move into digital format.

The content of Pravda was in Lithuanian. Each issue consisted of "The monthly truth" according to the month's topic; articles about what is going on, where and when; clubbing recommendations; music, theatre, books and movie guide; cuisine; city block review; an interesting dream, etc.

References

External links
www.pravda.lt, former "Pravda" website

Magazines established in 2004
Magazines disestablished in 2010
Magazines published in Lithuania
Lifestyle magazines
Monthly magazines
Independent magazines
2004 establishments in Lithuania
Youth magazines
Defunct magazines published in Lithuania